Uropterygius xanthopterus is a moray eel found in coral reefs in the Pacific and Indian oceans. It is commonly known as the freckleface reef-eel, spottedface moray, or the white-speckled snake moray.

References

xanthopterus
Fish described in 1859